Kovalivka is a village of Bila Tserkva Raion, Kyiv Oblast, Ukraine. It hosts the administration of Kovalivka rural hromada, one of the hromadas of Ukraine. The village is administered by its own rural council. The population is approximately 1,500.

History
The village was established in 1501 by a legendary blacksmith Myna Nazarenko. In 1753 here was built a wooden church of St. Volodymyr dedicated to Vladimir the Great. In 1797 Kovalivka became a center of volost within the Vasylkiv county. During the Soviet period, the village housed the Shchors collective farm (kolkhoz) which after dissolution of the Soviet Union was reorganized into an agro firm "Svitanok".

Since 1985 Kovalivka is dominated by a local agrarian company "Svitanok" (meaning "Dawn"), formerly "Shchors Kolkhoz" which is controlled by the Zasukha family (Anatoliy and Tetiana). In 1996 in the village was built a Church of Nativity of the Theotokos (Ukrainian Orthodox Church). In 2007 in Kovalivka started to be built a convent of St.Anastasia dedicated to the Russian Grand Duchess Alexandra Petrovna of Oldenburg (Ukrainian Orthodox Church (Moscow Patriarchate), UOC-MP). Since 2009 Kovalivka hosts ethnic festival "Zhnyva" (Reaping). In 2014 in the village was opened the Church of St.Tetiana dedicated to Tatiana of Rome (UOC-MP).

Until 18 July 2020, Kovalivka belonged to Vasylkiv Raion. The raion was abolished that day as part of the administrative reform of Ukraine, which reduced the number of raions of Kyiv Oblast to seven. The area of Vasylkiv Raion was split between Bila Tserkva, Fastiv, and Obukhiv Raions, with Kovalivka being transferred to Bila Tserkva Raion.

Geography
The village is located over a pond that was created on the Kamianka River which is a tributary of Ros River.

Points of interest
 Kolos Stadium, a home stadium of the local football club FC Kolos Kovalivka

References

External links
 Information about the village on tutbuv.com
 Profile at the Verkhovna Rada website

Villages in Bila Tserkva Raion